Scotland School District may refer to:
Scotland School District 4-3 - Scotland, South Dakota
Scotland School District (Arkansas) (defunct) - Scotland, Arkansas